Brookula contigua is a species of minute sea snail, a marine gastropod mollusc, unassigned in the superfamily Seguenzioidea.

Distribution
This species  is only known to occur at the Three Kings Islands, New Zealand.

References

contigua
Gastropods described in 1940